Foma Gordeyev is a 1959 Soviet drama film directed by Mark Donskoy.

Plot 
The film tells about the son of a rich merchant Foma Gordeyev, who with the help of alcohol tries to come to terms with the injustice of our world.

Cast 
 Sergei Lukyanov as Ignat Gordeyev
 Georgi Yepifantsev as Foma Gordeyev
 Pavel Tarasov as Yakov Mayakin
 Alla Labetskaya as Lyuba
 Marina Strizhenova as Sasha
 Mariya Milkova as Sofya Pavlovna Medynskaya
 Igor Sretensky as Yezhov
 Gennadiy Sergeev as Smolin

References

External links 
 

1959 films
1950s Russian-language films
Soviet drama films
1959 drama films